The 2018–19 West Virginia Mountaineers men's basketball team represented West Virginia University during the 2018–19 NCAA Division I men's basketball season. The Mountaineers were coached by Bob Huggins, in his 12th season as WVU's head coach, and played their home games at the WVU Coliseum in Morgantown, West Virginia as members of the Big 12 Conference. In a season of bad records, the team finished with the most losses in a season in school history and also had its first last-place finish in Big 12 Conference play. They finished the season 15-21, 4-14 in Big 12 Play to finish in last place. They defeated Oklahoma and Texas Tech to advance to the semifinals of the Big 12 tournament where they lost to Kansas. They received an at-large bid to the College Basketball Invitational where they defeated Grand Canyon in the First Round before losing in the quarterfinals to Coastal Carolina.

Previous season
The Mountaineers finished the 2017–18 season 26–11, 11–7 in Big 12 play to finish in a tie for second place. They defeated Baylor and Texas Tech to advance to the championship game of the Big 12 tournament where they lost to Kansas. They received an at-large bid to the NCAA tournament where they defeated Murray State and Marshall to advance to the Sweet Sixteen where they lost to Villanova.

Offseason

Departures

Incoming transfers

Recruits

Recruiting class of 2018

Recruiting class of 2019

Roster

On Feb 11, 2019 Esa Ahmad and Wesley Harris were dismissed from the team.

Schedule and results

|-
!colspan=9 style=| Exhibition

|-
!colspan=9 style=| Regular season

|-
!colspan=9 style=|Big 12 Tournament

|-
!colspan=9 style=|College Basketball Invitational
|-

Rankings

^Coaches did not release a Week 2 poll.

See also
 2018–19 West Virginia Mountaineers women's basketball team

References

West Virginia
West Virginia Mountaineers men's basketball seasons
West Virginia Mountaineers men's bask
West Virginia Mountaineers men's bask
West Virginia